Nemətabad (also, Ne’mətabad, Nametabad, and Neymetabad) is a village and municipality in the Yevlakh Rayon of Azerbaijan. It has a population of 2,062. The municipality consists of the villages of Nemətabad and Düzdaq.

References 

Populated places in Yevlakh District